Soso Liparteliani (born February 3, 1971) is a Georgian judoka. At the 1996 Summer Olympics he won the bronze medal in the men's Half Middleweight (73–81 kg) category, together with Cho In-Chul.

He was silver medalist European championship in Athens 1993

Champion International Tournament Tbilisi 1992, 1993, in Moscow 1995,

External links
 http://www.judoinside.com/uk/?factfile/view/2648/soso_liparteliani
Olympics database profile

Male judoka from Georgia (country)
1971 births
Living people
Judoka at the 1996 Summer Olympics
Olympic judoka of Georgia (country)
Olympic medalists in judo
Medalists at the 1996 Summer Olympics
Olympic bronze medalists for Georgia (country)